Josué Isaac Cárcamo Galindo (born 9 August 2006) is a Honduran professional footballer who plays as a midfielder for Victoria.

Career statistics

Club

Notes

References

Living people
2006 births
Honduran footballers
Association football midfielders
Liga Nacional de Fútbol Profesional de Honduras players
C.D. Victoria players